is a Japanese professional golfer who currently plays on the Japan Golf Tour. He has eight wins on the Tour, and had his best year during the 2000 season.

Fukabori was born in Tokyo. He turned professional in 1995.

Fukabori's best finish in a major was a tie for 30th at the 2004 Open Championship. He also finished tied for 57th in the 2005 U.S. Open.

Professional wins (11)

Japan Golf Tour wins (8)

*Note: The 2001 Juken Sangyo Open Hiroshima was shortened to 54 holes due to rain.
 The Japan Open Golf Championship is also a Japan major championship.

Japan Golf Tour playoff record (2–0)

Japan Challenge Tour wins (1)
1993 Korakuen Cup (5th)

Other wins (1)
1996 Kanto Open (Japan)

Japan PGA Senior Tour wins (1)
2021 Cosmohealth Cup Senior Golf Tournament

Results in major championships

T = Tied
CUT = missed the halfway cut
Note: Fukabori never played in the Masters Tournament or the PGA Championship.

Team appearances
Dynasty Cup (representing Japan): 2003, 2005
Royal Trophy (representing Asia): 2006

References

External links

Japanese male golfers
Japan Golf Tour golfers
Sportspeople from Tokyo
1968 births
Living people